Quna Quna Q'asa (Quechua quna quna a species of moth (Scrobipalpula), q'asa mountain pass, also spelled Khona Khona Khasa) is a mountain in the Bolivian Andes which reaches a height of approximately . It is located in the Cochabamba Department, Quillacollo Province, Quillacollo Municipality. Quna Quna Q'asa lies southeast of Wila Qullu Punta and Q'illu Suchusqa.

References 

Mountains of Cochabamba Department